Deborah D. Blumer was a Democratic member of the Massachusetts House of Representatives from Framingham.  She served in the House from 2001 until her death.

Blumer was graduated magna cum laude from Framingham State College, and subsequently earned an MBA with distinctions from the Simmons College Graduate School of Management.  Prior to her election to the House in 2000, she worked for several businesses, including Compaq.  In the House, she served on the Joint Committee on Higher Education, the Joint Committee on Children and Families, and the Joint Committee on Public Health.

Initial reports indicated that Blumer suffered a heart attack while driving. She was pronounced dead at MetroWest Medical Center, and is survived by her husband, children, and grandchildren. At the time of her death, Blumer was he was five away from her 65th birthday.

Blumer was a supporter of Israel and Jewish-related causes. Her funeral was held at Temple Beth Am in Framingham.

Although she was nearly one month deceased as of the Massachusetts House elections, 2006, Democrats were unable to replace her as their candidate due to filing deadlines. Running post-mortem, she finished in third place, garnering 20% of the vote behind two write-in candidates. Write-in candidate Democrat Pam Richardson succeeded her, winning 37% of the vote.

See also
 2001–2002 Massachusetts legislature
 2003–2004 Massachusetts legislature
 2005–2006 Massachusetts legislature

References

External links
 

1941 births
2006 deaths
Jewish American state legislators in Massachusetts
Members of the Massachusetts House of Representatives
People from Framingham, Massachusetts
Simmons University alumni
Women state legislators in Massachusetts
20th-century American politicians
20th-century American women politicians
20th-century American Jews
21st-century American Jews
21st-century American women